Simone Ravanelli (born 4 July 1995) is an Italian cyclist, who currently rides for UCI ProTeam . In October 2020, he was named in the startlist for the 2020 Giro d'Italia.

Major results

2014
 1st Young rider classification Giro della Valle d'Aosta
2015
 7th Overall Giro della Valle d'Aosta
2016
 2nd Overall Tour of Bulgaria
 3rd GP Kranj
 7th Coppa Città di Offida
2017
 8th Trofeo Città di San Vendemiano
2018
 1st Trofeo Alcide Degasperi
 2nd Giro del Medio Brenta
 3rd Trofeo Città di Brescia
 5th Overall Giro della Regione Friuli Venezia Giulia
2019
 1st Giro del Medio Brenta
 3rd Giro dell'Appennino
 4th GP Slovenian Istria
 5th Overall Tour de la Mirabelle
 5th Trofeo Città di Brescia
 8th GP Adria Mobil
 9th Overall Istrian Spring Trophy
2020
 4th Overall Tour du Rwanda
2021
 9th Overall Tour de Savoie Mont-Blanc
 10th Overall Giro di Sicilia

Grand Tour general classification results timeline

References

External links

1995 births
Living people
Italian male cyclists
Cyclists from the Province of Bergamo